Transforming growth factor (or TGF) is used to describe two classes of polypeptide growth factors, TGFα and TGFβ.

The name "Transforming Growth Factor" is somewhat arbitrary, since the two classes of TGFs are not structurally or genetically related to one another, and they act through different receptor mechanisms.  Furthermore, they do not always induce cellular transformation, and are not the only growth factors that induce cellular transformation.

Types
 TGFα is upregulated in some human cancers. It is produced in macrophages, brain cells, and keratinocytes, and induces epithelial development. It belongs to the EGF family.
 TGFβ exists in three known subtypes in humans, TGFβ1, TGFβ2, and TGFβ3.  These are upregulated in Marfan's syndrome and some human cancers, and play crucial roles in tissue regeneration, cell differentiation, embryonic development, and regulation of the immune system. Isoforms of transforming growth factor-beta (TGF-β1) are also thought to be involved in the pathogenesis of pre-eclampsia. TGFβ receptors are single pass serine/threonine kinase receptors. They belong to the transforming growth factor beta family.

Function
These proteins were originally characterized by their capacity to induce oncogenic transformation in a specific cell culture system, rat kidney fibroblasts.  Application of the transforming growth factors to normal rat kidney fibroblasts induces the cultured cells to proliferate and overgrow, no longer subject to the normal inhibition caused by contact between cells.

See also
 Bone morphogenetic protein
 TGF beta signaling pathway
 Tubuloglomerular feedback

References

External links
 Tumor growth factor (TGF) citations
 
 

Growth factors
Signal transduction